Corymbia ferriticola, commonly known as the Pilbara ghost gum, is a species of tree or a mallee that is endemic to Western Australia. It has smooth bark, lance-shaped adult leaves, flower buds in groups of seven, creamy white flowers and shortened spherical to cylindrical fruit.

Description
It has powdery, white to pink bark weathering to light brown, sometimes with rough, grey, tessellated bark at the base. Flowering has been observed in December and January and the flowers are creamy white.

Taxonomy and naming
Pilbara ghost gum was first formally described in 1986 by Ian Brooker and Walter Edgecombe in the journal Nuytsia and was given the name Eucalyptus ferriticola. In 1995 Ken Hill and Lawrie Johnson changed the name to Corymbia ferriticola.
The type specimen was collected in 1983 by Brooker and Edgecombe from Wittenoom Gorge. The specific epithet has Latin origins and is in reference to the iron rich habitat of the plant.

Distribution and habitatCorymbia ferriticola mainly grows on ironstone hills, in gorges and on steep slopes in the Pilbara region, with scattered populations near Mount Augustus, Meekatharra and the Gibson Desert.
It is mostly found as isolated trees. The species is often associated with Eucalyptus leucophloia, Eucalyptus pilbarensis Ficus platypoda, Astrotricha hamptonii as well as species of Triodia and Eremophilia''.

Conservation
This eucalypt is classified as "not threatened" by the Western Australian Government Department of Parks and Wildlife.

See also
 List of Corymbia species

References

ferriticola
Myrtales of Australia
Flora of Western Australia
Plants described in 1986
Taxa named by Ken Hill (botanist)
Taxa named by Lawrence Alexander Sidney Johnson